Tornike "Toko" Shengelia (born October 5, 1991) is a Georgian professional basketball player for Virtus Bologna. At a height of 2.06 m (6 ft 9 in) tall, he plays at the power forward position. Shengelia also represents the senior Georgian national team. He earned an All-EuroLeague First Team selection in 2018.

Professional career

Early career
From 2008 to 2010, Shengelia played for both Valencia Basket and its junior team, Valencia BC Sunny Delight. In 2010, he signed with Spirou Charleroi of Belgium, who later loaned him to VOO Verviers-Pepinster for the 2010–11 season. In August 2011, it was announced that he would play for Spirou Charleroi in 2011–12.

Brooklyn Nets (2012–2014)
Shengelia was selected with the 54th overall pick in the 2012 NBA draft by Philadelphia 76ers. He was later traded to the Brooklyn Nets on draft night. In July 2012, he joined the Nets for the 2012 NBA Summer League. In 5 games, he averaged 10.2 points and 3.6 rebounds per game.

On July 24, 2012, Shengelia signed with the Nets. During his rookie and sophomore seasons, he had multiple assignments with the Springfield Armor of the NBA D-League.

Chicago Bulls (2014)
On January 21, 2014, Shengelia was traded to the Chicago Bulls in exchange for Marquis Teague. On April 14, 2014, he was waived by the Bulls.

Baskonia (2014–2020)
On June 21, 2014, Shengelia signed a three-year deal with Baskonia.

On March 1, 2015, the basque derby with Bilbao Basket finished with a brawl where Dejan Todorović of Bilbao and he were disqualified and 12 players were ejected due to court invasion during the fight. With four seconds left and Bilbao winning by a huge margin, despite the referee's call for a traveling, Todorović was going to dunk when Todorović was hit by him. After this, the Serbian player pushed him from behind and the Georgian forward reacted with a punch. After this, all the players who were in the bench came into the court and started the brawl. When Shengelia was leaving the court after the disqualifying foul, he apologized to a child who was in the first row of the arena.

The ACB announced this brawl would have severe consequences and sanctions and would talk with the Spanish Basketball Federation for changing the disciplinary regulations. On March 5, the league provisionally suspended Todorović and Shengelia until the final resolution of the case.

Both clubs claimed to have the same sanctions than in 2004, when the brawl Real Madrid and Estudiantes occurred. Finally, on March 11, the Disciplinary Judge accorded to suspend him for five games, Todorović for four and a €3,000 fine to Bilbao Basket player Dairis Bertāns and to Baskonia brothers Mamadou and Ilimane Diop.

On June 7, 2017, Shengelia signed a three-year contract extension with Baskonia. Over 33 EuroLeague games, he averaged career-highs of 13.7 points, 6.1 rebounds and 2.2 assists per game. In May 2018, he was named the All-EuroLeague First Team for the 2017–18 season. On 24 May 2018, he finished in second place behind Luka Dončić in voting for the Liga ACB MVP of the season. On August 19, 2018, Shengelia signed a four-year contract extension with Baskonia until 2022.

CSKA Moscow (2020–2022)
On 9 July 2020, he signed a three-year contract with Russian club CSKA Moscow.

On 26 February 2022, Shengelia terminated the contract in protest of Russia's invasion of Ukraine. He said: "I take this decision in protest against Russia's invasion of Ukraine. I do not consider it possible to continue playing for the Russian army club." The team accused him and others of violating their contracts; however, with Russia being suspended from the Euroleague and FIBA, CSKA cannot pursue any legal action.

Virtus Bologna (2022–present)
On 7 March 2022, Shengelia signed a deal with the Italian club Virtus Bologna until the end of the season. Moreover, after having ousted Lietkabelis, Ulm and Valencia in the first three rounds of the playoffs, on 11 May 2022, Virtus defeated Frutti Extra Bursaspor by 80–67 at the Segafredo Arena, winning its first EuroCup and qualifying for the EuroLeague after 14 years. However, despite having ended the regular season at the first place and having ousted 3–0 both Pesaro and Tortona in the first two rounds of playoffs, Virtus was defeated 4–2 in the national finals by Olimpia Milano.

On 13 September, Shengelia signed a two-year-deal with Virtus until June 2024. On 29 September 2022, after having ousted Milano in the semifinals, Virtus won its third Supercup, defeating 72–69 Banco di Sardegna Sassari and achieving a back-to-back, following the 2021 trophy. However, Shengelia did not play due to a shoulder injury occurred before the 2022 EuroBasket.

National team career
Shengelia is a member of the senior Georgian national team. With Georgia, he played at the 2011 EuroBasket, the 2015 EuroBasket, and the 2017 EuroBasket.

In February 2023, Shengelia was a key player on the roster of Georgia that qualified for its first-ever World Cup in 2023.

Career statistics

NBA

Regular season

|-
| style="text-align:left;"| 
| style="text-align:left;"| Brooklyn
| 19 || 0 || 4.9 || .435 || .500 || .563 || 1.2 || .2 || .2 || .1 || 1.6
|-
| style="text-align:left;"| 
| style="text-align:left;"| Brooklyn
| 17 || 0 || 8.1 || .458 || .000 || .375 || .8 || .7 || .1 || .1 || 1.5
|-
| style="text-align:left;"| 
| style="text-align:left;"| Chicago
| 9 || 0 || 1.9 || .500 || .000 || .000 || .2 || .2 || .1 || .0 || .4
|- class="sortbottom"
| style="text-align:left;"| Career
| style="text-align:left;"|
| 45 || 0 || 5.5 || .451 || .125 || .500 || .9 || .4 || .1 || .1 || 1.3

EuroLeague

|-
| style="text-align:left;"| 2011–12
| style="text-align:left;"| Charleroi
| 9 || 9 || 20.6 || .500 || .286 || .682 || 4.3 || 1.0 || .3 || .1 || 8.3 || 7.1
|-
| style="text-align:left;"| 2014–15
| style="text-align:left;" rowspan=6| Baskonia
| 24 || 23 || 21.6 || .439 || .229 || .820 || 4.8 || .8 || .6 || .7 || 9.5 || 10.3
|-
| style="text-align:left;"| 2015–16
| 9 || 7 || 19.2 || .561 || .500 || .682 || 3.8 || 1.2 || .8 || .6 || 9.1 || 10.4
|-
| style="text-align:left;"| 2016–17
| 24 || 13 || 20.8 || .511 || .542 || .778 || 4.1 || 1.4 || .8 || .3 || 10.8 || 12.0
|-
| style="text-align:left;"| 2017–18
| 33 || 17 || 25.5 || .569 || .326 || .681 || 6.1 || 2.2 || .8 || .5 || 13.7 || 18.2
|-
| style="text-align:left;"| 2018–19
| 20 || 15 || 24.2 || .526 || .393 || .529 || 4.3 || 1.6 || 1.1 || .6 || 11.4 || 13.0
|-
| style="text-align:left;"| 2019–20
| 28 || 28 || 30.2 || .586 || .391 || .769 || 5.6 || 2.9 || 1.0 || .5 || 15.9 || 18.5
|-
| style="text-align:left;"| 2020–21
| style="text-align:left;" rowspan=2| CSKA Moscow
| 37 || 35 || 24.5 || .508 || .315 || .651 || 4.9 || 2.3 || 1.2 || .2 || 11.2 || 12.1
|-
| style="text-align:left;"| 2021–22
| 15 || 13 || 24.4 || .527 || .333 || .733 || 4.7 || 2.5 || .9 || .3 || 12.7 || 14.1
|- class="sortbottom"
| style="text-align:center;" colspan=2 | Career
| 197 || 159 || 24.2 || .526 || .365 || .707 || 4.9 || 1.9 || .9 || .5 || 12.0 || 13.8

Domestic leagues

References

External links

Tornike Shengelia at archive.fiba.com
Tornike Shengelia at acb.com 
Tornike Shengelia at draftexpress.com
Tornike Shengelia at eurobasket.com
Tornike Shengelia at euroleague.net
Tornike Shengelia at fibaeurope.com

1991 births
Living people
Brooklyn Nets players
Chicago Bulls players
Expatriate basketball people from Georgia (country) in the United States
Expatriate basketball people from Georgia (country) in Spain
Expatriate basketball people from Georgia (country) in Belgium
Expatriate basketball people from Georgia (country) in Russia
Liga ACB players
Men's basketball players from Georgia (country)
National Basketball Association players from Georgia (country)
Philadelphia 76ers draft picks
Power forwards (basketball)
RBC Pepinster players
Saski Baskonia players
Small forwards
Spirou Charleroi players
Basketball players from Tbilisi
Springfield Armor players
Valencia Basket players
Expatriate basketball people from Georgia (country) in Italy